"Just for One Day (Heroes)" is a house song performed by French DJ David Guetta, and featuring vocals from singer David Bowie. The song was released as the lead single from Guetta's compilation album, Fuck Me I'm Famous 2003 in June 2003, and was also credited as the fifth single from his debut studio album, Just a Little More Love. The song contains a sample from Bowie's 1970s track, "Heroes". The track was officially credited to 'David Guetta vs. Bowie'. It peaked at No. 73 on the UK Singles Chart in July 2003. The music video for "Just for One Day (Heroes)" can be found on YouTube. It features a group of people partying at a rave, with Guetta performing the track in the background.

Track listing
 German CD single
 "Just For One Day (Heroes)" (radio edit) – 3:00
 "Just For One Day (Heroes)" (extended version) – 6:39
 "Distortion" (Maxi Vocal Remix) – 7:02

 French CD single
 "Just For One Day (Heroes)" (radio edit) – 3:00
 "Just A Little More Love" (Wally Lopez Remix Edit) – 3:45
 "Distortion" (Maxi Vocal Remix) – 7:02
 "Just For One Day (Heroes)" (music video) – 3:00

Charts

References

2003 singles
David Guetta songs
Songs written by David Bowie
Song recordings produced by David Guetta